Luca Vanni was the defending champion but chose not to defend his title.

Lukáš Lacko won the title after defeating Laurynas Grigelis 6–1, 6–2 in the final.

Seeds

Draw

Finals

Top half

Bottom half

References
Main Draw
Qualifying Draw

Trofeo Città di Brescia - Singles
2017 Singles